Flight 175: As the World Watched is an American television documentary film that premiered in August 2006 on TLC. It covers the final moments of the passengers and crew on board United Airlines Flight 175, which was the second commercial airliner to strike the World Trade Center, impacted with the South Tower, and was the most visually documented (both photographed and filmed) flight during the September 11 attacks.

The documentary features interviews with a variety of people, including:
relatives of the passengers and crew members, some of whom received final phone calls from their loved ones,
 air traffic controllers who responded to the doomed flight, and
the two F-15 fighter pilots scrambled from Otis Air National Guard Base who flew in the airspace over Lower Manhattan during the event.

References

2006 television films
2006 films
Documentary films about the September 11 attacks
American documentary television films
TLC (TV network) original programming
2000s American films
United Airlines Flight 175